The 1999–2000 Belgian Hockey League season was the 80th season of the Belgian Hockey League, the top level of ice hockey in Belgium. Seven teams participated in the league, and Phantoms Deurne won the championship.

Regular season

Playoffs

Semifinals 
 Phantoms Deurne - HYC Herentals 5:4/3:1
 IHC Leuven - Griffoens Geel 7:1/8:5

3rd place 
 Griffoens Geel - HYC Herentals 3:8/2:9

Final 
 Phantoms Deurne - IHC Leuven 9:7/5:6

References
Season on hockeyarchives.info

Belgian Hockey League
Belgian Hockey League seasons
Bel